An-Sophie Mestach was the defending champion, but she chose to compete in Albuquerque instead.

The second seed Ysaline Bonaventure won the title, defeating qualifier Montserrat González in the final, 6–1, 6–2.

Seeds

Main draw

Finals

Top half

Bottom half

References 
 Main draw

Internacional Femenil Monterrey - Singles